2012 United States Olympic basketball team may refer to:

2012 United States men's Olympic basketball team
The women's basketball team that represented the United States at the 2012 Summer Olympics